The Junta of Castile and León (JCyL) is the governing and administrative body of the Spanish autonomous community of Castile and León and serves as the executive branch and regulatory authority. It comprises the President of the Junta, the vice-presidents and the ministers (consejeros). The function of the Junta is to govern and administer the autonomous community.

The President and the seat of government 
The President of the Council is the ultimate representative of the community. The president directs the actions of the Junta of Castile and León and plays a coordinating role among Council members. The seat of the presidency is at the School of the Assumption of Valladolid, whose original blueprints from 1902 are attributed to Santiago Guadilla.
The President is chosen by the Cortes of Castile and León, can be removed by them if he or she loses the support of more than half of the representatives, and has the capacity to appoint and dismiss the ministers. The term of a president is tied to the legislature term length (the default legislative term is four years), and the president may be reelected without term limit.

Presidents since inception (1983) 
 Demetrio Madrid López (PSOE) (1983–86)
 José Constantino Nalda García (PSOE) (1986–1987)
 José María Aznar López (PP) (1987–89)
 Jesús María Posada Moreno (PP) (1989–91)
 Juan José Lucas Giménez (PP) (1991–2001)
 Juan Vicente Herrera Campo (PP) (2001–19)
 Alfonso Fernández Mañueco (PP) (2019–present)
In the pre-autonomous stage, the General Council of Castile and León (1978–83) was chaired by Juan Manuel Reol Tejada (UCD) during the period 1978–80 and by José Manuel García-Verdugo Candón (UCD) during the period 1981–83.

Vice-presidents and ministers 

The President can appoint and dismiss freely one or more vice-presidents. At the head of each ministry there is a minister, who is appointed freely by the President, and each one is subdivided into departments that coordinate and direct the administrative services. Some ministries include one or more vice ministers in their structure. In addition each ministry has a general secretary, various departments and even diverse autonomous branches and state-owned companies.

In Decree No. 2/2015, of 7 July, from the President of the Junta of Castile and León, regarding restructuring of the ministries, the current organizational structure of the Board of Castile and León is defined.

The current council and its ministers (Spanish: consejeros) are:

Transferred responsibilities 
(From the central government to the community)
 Health
 Universities
 Education (non university)
 Agriculture
 Employment
 Social services

Advisory board 
This is the supreme advisory organism of the Government of the Council. Its decisions are not binding, that is to say, the Council is not obliged to follow its opinions.

It is composed by five members, three elected by the Courts and two by the Council.

Its headquarters is in the city of Zamora.

See also 
 Castile and León
 Cortes of Castile and León
 President of the Junta of Castile and León

References

External links 
 Advisory board of CyL